WYGS (91.1 FM) is a radio station broadcasting a Southern Gospel format licensed to Hope, Indiana, United States. It serves the Columbus, Indiana area. The station is currently owned by Good Shepherd Radio, Inc.

WYGS is also heard on WKRY 88.1 in Versailles, Indiana, WAUZ 89.1 in Greensburg, Indiana, WHMO 91.1 in Madison, Indiana, and W248AF 97.5 in Batesville, Indiana.

External links
WYGS's website 
 

Columbus, Indiana
Southern Gospel radio stations in the United States
YGS